Fool's Paradise may refer to:



Films
 Fool's Paradise (1921 film), a film by Cecil B DeMille
 
 Fool's Paradise, a 1997 film with Karen Duffy
 Fool's Paradise (2023 film), upcoming 2023 film by Charlie Day

Music
 Fool's Paradise (opera), a 1994 opera by Ofer Ben-Amots, based on a story by Isaac Bashevis Singer

Albums
 Fool's Paradise (Monday Morning album), 2005
 Fool's Paradise (The Head Cat album), 2006
 Fool's Paradise (Cold Specks album), a 2017 album by the band Cold Specks
 A Fool's Paradise, a 1973 album by the American band Lazarus

Songs
 "Fool's Paradise", a 1955 song first recorded by Johnny Fuller and covered by:
Charles Brown (musician), 1955
Sam Cooke, on the 1963 album Night Beat 
Mose Allison, on the 1965 album Mose Alive!
 "Fool's Paradise", a 1956 song by Eddie Cochran and Hank Cochran with Jerry Capehart
 "Fool's Paradise", a 1958 song recorded by Buddy Holly and The Crickets
 Covered in 1973 by Don McLean
 "Fool's Paradise", a 1972 song by The Sylvers
 "Fool's Paradise", a 1985 song by Oingo Boingo on the album Dead Man's Party
 "Fool's Paradise", a 1986 song by Meli'sa Morgan
 "Fool's Paradise", a 1996 song by Welsh singer Donna Lewis
 "A Fool's Paradise", a song by Symphony X from the 2000 album V: The New Mythology Suite

Other uses
 "Fool's Paradise", a short story by Isaac Bashevis Singer included in his collection Zlateh the Goat and Other Stories
 "Fool's Paradise (Evil Con Carne)", an episode of Evil Con Carne
 "Fool's Paradise", an episode of The Loud House

See also
Paradise of Fools